Astain (also Romanized as Asta‘īn and Esta‘īn; also known as Āshe‘īn) is a village in Daman Kuh Rural District, in the Central District of Esfarayen County, North Khorasan Province, Iran. At the 2006 census, its population was 186, in 38 families.

References 

Populated places in Esfarayen County